This list of alumni of Türk Maarif Koleji includes graduates, non-graduate former students, and current students of Türk Maarif Koleji, Nicosia, Northern Cyprus.

Politicians

Government

Prime Ministers 
 Serdar Denktaş (acting, 2005)
 Tufan Erhürman (2018-2019)

Deputy Prime Ministers 
 Hasan Taçoy (acting, 2015)
 Serdar Denktaş (1996-1998, 2004-2006, 2013-2015, 2016-2018)

Cabinet Ministers 
 Hasan Taçoy, Economy and Energy (2019-present), Public Works and Transport (2009-2010, 2014-2015), Economy, Tourism, Culture and Sport (acting, 2015)
 Tolga Atakan, Public Works and Transport (2018-present)
 Asım Vehbi, Environment and Natural Resources (2006-2008)
 Birikim Özgür, Finance (2015-2016), Economy, Industry and Commerce (acting, 2016)
 Derviş Kemal Deniz, Economy and Tourism (2004-2006)
 Filiz Besim, Health (2018-2019)
 Gülsün Yücel, Interior (2013)
 Hakan Dinçyürek, Environment and Natural Resources (2014-2015)
 Kutlay Erk, Foreign Affairs (2013)
 Kutlu Evren, Interior (2016-2018)
 Mehmet Altınay, Finance (1976), Labour and Social Security (1985-1986), National Education and Culture (1998-2001)
 Mehmet Harmancı, Tourism, Environment and Culture (2013)
 Özdemir Berova, National Education and Culture (2016-2017)
 Özdil Nami, Foreign Affairs (2013-2015), Economy and Energy (2018-2019)
 Raşit Pertev, Agriculture and Forestry (2004-2005)
 Sami Dayıoğlu, Agriculture and Natural Resources (2013)
 Serdar Denktaş, Interior, Rural Affairs and Environment (1990-1992), Sport, Youth and Environment (1994-1995), State (1996-1998), Labour and Settlement (acting, 1998), Tourism and Environment (2001-2004), Foreign Affairs (2004-2006), Economy, Tourism, Culture and Sport (2013-2015), National Education (acting, 2014), Finance (2016-2019), National Education and Culture (acting, 2017-2018)
 Tahsin Ertuğruloğlu, Foreign Affairs and Defence (1998-2004), Transport (2015-2016), Foreign Affairs (2016-2018)

Parliament

Deputy Speakers 
 Hüseyin Avkıran Alanlı (2015-2018)

Leaders of Main Opposition 
 Serdar Denktaş (1998-2000, 2015-2016)
 Tahsin Ertuğruloğlu (2006-2008)
 Tufan Erhürman (2016-2018, 2019-present)

Members of Parliament 
 Biray Hamzaoğluları (2013-present) 
 Doğuş Derya (2013-present) 
 Erek Çağatay (2018-present)
 Fazilet Özdenefe (2013-present) 
 Gülşah Sanver Manavoğlu (2018-present)
 Hakan Dinçyürek (2013-present) 
 Hasan Taçoy (1998-present) 
 Jale Refik Rogers (2018-present)
 Koral Çağman (2018-present)
 Kutlu Evren (2013-present) 
 Özdemir Berova (2013-present) 
 Özdil Nami (2003-present) 
 Serdar Denktaş (1990-1993, 1993-present)
 Sıla Usar İncirli (2018-present)
 Tolga Atakan (2018-present)
 Tufan Erhürman (2013-present) 
 Birikim Özgür (2013-2018) 
 Hüseyin Avkıran Alanlı (2003-2018) 
 Mehmet Altınay (1976-1990)
 Raif Denktaş (1976-1981, 1983-1985)
 Savaş Atakan (1998-2003)
 Tahsin Ertuğruloğlu (1998-2018)

Members of Parliamentary Assembly of the Council of Europe 
 Özdil Nami (2005-2008) 
 Tahsin Ertuğruloğlu (2009-2010)

Mayors

Mayors of Nicosia 
 Mehmet Harmancı (2014-present)
 Kutlay Erk (2002-2006)

Mayors of Lefke 
 Aziz Kaya (2014-present)

Bureaucrats and diplomats

Ambassadors 
 Mustafa Lakadamyalı, Ambassador of Northern Cyprus to Turkey (2010-2014)

Negotiations Team

Chief Negotiators 
 Özdil Nami
 Raşit Pertev

Members of Negotiations Team 
 Barış Burcu
 Erhan Erçin
 Sertaç Güven
 Sülen Karabacak Mehrübeoğlu
 Tufan Erhürman, former

Advisors to the President 
 Erhan Erçin, Special Advisor on Diplomacy and European Union Affairs
 Güneş Onar, Advisory and Political Affairs Director
 Ömer Gökçekuş, Special Advisor on Economy
 Sülen Karabacak Mehrübeoğlu, Special Advisor for Legal Affairs
 Raif Denktaş, former Advisor on Politics

Other 
 Serdar Çam, President of Turkish Cooperation and Coordination Agency, Turkey

Artists

Musicians 
 Ali Hoca
 Arda Gündüz
 Buray Hoşsöz
 Cahit Kutrafalı
 Erdinç Gündüz
 Genco Ecer
 Günay Bozkurt
 Oskay Hoca
 Raif Denktaş

Poets, authors and writers 
 Neşe Yaşın
 Özdemir Tokel
 Raşit Pertev
 Sevgül Uludağ
 Süleyman Ergüçlü

Fashion designers 
 Abdullah Öztoprak
 Hussein Chalayan

Screenwriters 
 Tamer Garip

Academia 
 Birikim Özgür, assistant professor of educational sciences at European University of Lefke
 Emine Beton, former headmistress of Türk Maarif Koleji
 Erol Kaymak, professor of politics at Eastern Mediterranean University
 Fehmi Tokay, headmaster of Türk Maarif Koleji
 Halil Güven, professor, dean of San Diego State University Georgia Campus
 Hüseyin Yaratan, associate professor of education at Cyprus International University, head of executive board of Atatürk Teacher Training Academy
 Mehmet Ali Yükselen, rector of European University of Lefke
 Mustafa Djamgoz, professor of cancer biology at Imperial College London
 Raif Denktaş, former lecturer of politics at Eastern Mediterranean University
 Süleyman Başak, professor of finance at London Business School, University of London
 Tufan Erhürman, former associate professor of public law at Eastern Mediterranean University
 Uğur Dağlı, professor of architecture at Eastern Mediterranean University

Businesspeople 
 Asım Vehbi, CEO of Girne American University
 Lisani Atasayan, general manager of Coca-Cola Içecek
 Ozan Dağlı, founder of Dağlı Trading Ltd. 
 Suat Günsel, founder of Near East University

Sportspeople 
 Adem Kaan Kaner, president of Yenicami Ağdelen Kulübü
 Ali Başman, former president of Küçük Kaymaklı Türk Spor Kulübü 
 Asım Vehbi, former president of Çetinkaya Türk Spor Kulübü
 Halit Kıryağdı, former basketball player, basketball coach
 Hüseyin Amcaoğlu, former footballer and captain of Northern Cyprus national football team
 Hüseyin Can Ağdelen, chess player, Northern Cyprus champion, Turkey under-age champion
 Mehmet Özbilgehan, former international football referee
 Nevzat Nasıroğlu, basketballer
 Orçun Kamalı, vice-president of Cyprus Turkish Football Association
 Yamaç Samani, chess player, Northern Cyprus champion
 Zehra Yılmaz, international volleyball referee

References